Henry Bamford Parkes (13 November 1904 – 7 January 1972) was a writer and professor of history at New York University. He was born in Sheffield, England.

Background
After reading history at Oxford University, Parkes came to the United States to pursue his graduate studies at the University of Michigan. He received his Ph.D. from Michigan in 1929 and joined the history faculty of New York University in 1930. He had also lectured at Barnard College, the University of Wyoming, the New School for Social Research and the University of Washington. From 1956 to 1957, Parkes was a Fulbright Fellow, working at the University of Athens in Greece.

Books
 

 Note: a third edition was published in 1972.

External links
 A review of Marxism: An Autopsy that appeared in Time magazine.

References
Henry Bamford Parkes' obituary

1904 births
1972 deaths
Writers from Sheffield
University of Michigan alumni
20th-century British historians
English male non-fiction writers
20th-century English male writers
British emigrants to the United States